Below is a list of multiple-barrel firearms of all forms from around the world.

Pistols

Rifles

Flare launchers

Less lethal

Automatic rifles

Submachine guns

Shotguns

Machine guns

Grenade launchers

See also
 Combination gun
 Double-barreled shotgun
 Lists of weapons
 List of firearms
 List of assault rifles
 List of machine guns
 List of pistols
 List of semi-automatic pistols
 List of revolvers
 List of sniper rifles
 List of grenade launchers

References

multiple barrel
Multiple-barrel firearms